Houshang is a given name. Notable people with the name include:

 Houshang Asadi (born 1951), Iranian journalist and writer
 Houshang Golmakani, Iranian journalist, film critic and director
 Houshang Golshiri (1938–2000), Iranian fiction writer, critic and editor
 Houshang Kargarnejad (born 1945), retired Iranian heavyweight weightlifter who competed at the 1976 Summer Olympics
 Houshang Moradi Kermani (born 1944), Iranian writer best known for children's and young adult fiction
 Houshang Mashian (born 1938), Iranian-Israeli chess master
 Houshang Montazeralzohour (1947–1982), Iranian Greco-Roman wrestler who competed in the 1976 Summer Olympics
 Houshang Ostovar (1927–2016), Persian symphonic music composer and instructor
 Houshang Rafati, Iranian basketball player
 Amir Houshang Keshavarz Sadr (1933–2013), scholar of Iranian history and a prominent civic-nationalist activist
 Houshang Seddigh, Iranian retired fighter pilot
 Houshang Zarif (born 1938), Iranian master musician and renowned tar player

See also 
 
 
 Hoshan (disambiguation)
 Husan
 Hushang (name)
 Ushan (disambiguation)

Iranian masculine given names
Persian masculine given names